GAT100 is a negative allosteric modulator of the cannabinoid CB1 receptor.

See also 
 Org 27569
 PSNCBAM-1
 ZCZ-011

References 

Cannabinoids
CB1 receptor antagonists
Isothiocyanates